Southend News Network was a news parody website that aims to "have a dig at the powers that be". Starting as a local spoof news site from the UK, it shot to national, and then international, fame after several cases where an SNN story caused confusion by being taken as fact, including by the English Defence League, a far-right network.  Another claim to fame was their recognition as an "official media outlet" by local government.

In January 2018, journalist Milo Yiannopoulos read out during a live YouTube broadcast an article from the site prompting questions about his source checking.

As of May 2021 the domain has expired and is parked. As of December 2021 it's been re-registered by another person and redirects to a website that seemingly posts clickbait and spam articles.

See also	
 List of satirical news websites

References

British satirical websites
Internet properties established in 2015